is a former Japanese football player.

Playing career
Kobayashi was born in Itabashi, Tokyo on May 6, 1983. He joined J1 League club Urawa Reds from youth team in 2002. However he could not play at all in the match. In 2004, he moved to Japan Football League (JFL) club Yokogawa Musashino. He became a regular forward soon and played many matches in 3 seasons. In 2006 season, he scored 23 goals and became a 2nd top scorer. In 2007, he moved to JFL club Rosso Kumamoto (later Roasso Kumamoto). He played many matches and Rosso was promoted to J2 League end of 2007 season. However he could hardly play in the match in 2008 season. In 2009, he moved to Regional Leagues club Matsumoto Yamaga FC. He became a regular forward and Yamaga was promoted to JFL end of 2009 season. In 2011, he re-joined JFL club Yokogawa Musashino. He played as regular forward until 2012 season. However his opportunity to play decreased in 2013 and he retired end of 2013 season.

Club statistics

References

External links 

1983 births
Living people
Association football people from Tokyo
Japanese footballers
J1 League players
J2 League players
Japan Football League players
Urawa Red Diamonds players
Tokyo Musashino United FC players
Roasso Kumamoto players
Matsumoto Yamaga FC players
Association football forwards